The Malagasy kingfisher or Madagascar kingfisher (Corythornis vintsioides) is a species of bird in the family Alcedinidae that is found in Madagascar, Mayotte and the Comoros. Its natural habitat is subtropical or tropical mangrove forests.

The Malagasy kingfisher was formally described by the French naturalists Joseph Eydoux and Paul Gervais in 1836 and given the binomial name Alcedo vintsioides. It is closely related to the malachite kingfisher (Corythornis cristatus) which is widely distributed in mainland Africa. It is one of only two kingfishers that occur in Madagascar. The other is the Madagascar pygmy kingfisher (Corythornis madagascariensis).

There are two subspecies:
 C. v. johannae Meinertzhagen, R., 1924 – Comoro Islands
 C. v. vintsioides (Eydoux & Gervais, 1836) – Madagascar

It has dark blue upperparts, rufous underparts and a crested blue-and-green-barred crown. The bill is black. The sexes are alike. The blue plumage of the race C. v. johannae is paler and greener than that of the nominate.

Gallery

See also
Madagascar pygmy kingfisher
List of birds of Madagascar

References

Malagasy kingfisher
Birds of the Comoros
Birds of Madagascar
Birds of Mayotte
Malagasy kingfisher
Taxonomy articles created by Polbot